Canton Township may refer to:

 Canton Township, Fulton County, Illinois
 Canton Township, McPherson County, Kansas
 Canton Township, Michigan
 Canton Township, Fillmore County, Minnesota
 Canton Township, Stark County, Ohio
 Canton Township, Bradford County, Pennsylvania
 Canton Township, Washington County, Pennsylvania

See also 
 Canton (disambiguation)

Township name disambiguation pages